Döngelli can refer to:

 Döngelli, Akçakoca
 Döngelli, Çilimli